Events in the year 1209 in Norway.

Incumbents
Monarch: Inge II Bårdsson

Events

Arts and literature

Births

Deaths
Margrete Eriksdotter, queen consort of Norway (born c.1155).

References

Norway